Stephen van Rensselaer I (March 23, 1707 – June 1747), was the second son of Kiliaen van Rensselaer and Maria van Cortlandt, who served briefly as the 7th Patroon of the Manor of Rensselaerswyck and 4th Lord of the Manor.

Life
Stephen van Rensselaer was born on March 23, 1707 and was the second son of Kiliaen van Rensselaer (1663–1719) and Maria van Cortlandt.  He grew up in the family manor house, just north of Albany, New York.

Manor of Rensselaerswyck 
After the death of his brother, who did not marry and had no children, he became the seventh patroon of Rensselaerwyck and the fourth Lord of the Manor, serving from 1745 until his death in 1747.

Personal life
He married Elizabeth Groesbeck on July 25, 1729 and had the following children:
Elizabeth van Rensselaer (b. 1734), who married General Abraham Ten Broeck (1734–1810)
Stephen van Rensselaer II (1742–1769), fifth Lord of Rensselaerwyck, who married Catherine Livingston (1745–1810)
 4 other children

Upon the death of Stephen van Rensselaer II in 1769, his brother-in-law, Abraham Ten Broeck was named co-administrator of the Manor of Rensselaerswyck until 1785 when Stephen's son, Stephen Van Rensselaer III, came of age.

See also
Van Rensselaer family
Van Cortlandt family

References

1707 births
1747 deaths
American people of Dutch descent
Stephen I
New Netherland